It was the sixty-sixth Lebanese government after independence, and the third under President Emile Lahoud and the fifth government headed by Rafic Hariri. The government was formed on 17 April 2003 and the government resigned on 26 October 2004 after the term extension of President Emile Lahoud.

The cabinet was composed of the following:

References

2003 establishments in Lebanon
2004 disestablishments in Lebanon
Cabinets of Lebanon
Cabinets established in 2003
Cabinets disestablished in 2004